Paul Andrew is an English fashion designer. He launched his eponymous women's footwear line in September 2012.

Notable awards
In 2013, Paul Andrew was awarded the "Launch of the Year" by Footwear News, and was awarded "Accessories Design of the Year" for the 2013 edition of "Who is on Next?" In November 2014, he won the 11th annual Council of Fashion Designers of America/Vogue Fashion Fund, becoming the first and youngest British footwear designer to win the competition. In March 2015, Paul Andrew was nominated for a CFDA Swarovski Award for Accessory Design. In June 2016, Paul Andrew was awarded the CFDA Swarovski Award for Accessory Design In November 2016, Paul Andrew was honoured as Designer of the Year at the Footwear News Achievement Awards.

Personal life
As of 2015, Andrew has been in a relationship with Siddhartha Shukla since 2003.

References

English fashion designers
LGBT fashion designers
Shoe designers
Living people
Year of birth missing (living people)